The 2022 Orlando Open was a professional tennis tournament played on hard courts. It was the fifth edition of the tournament which was part of the 2022 ATP Challenger Tour. It took place in Orlando, Florida, United States between June 6 and 12 2022.

Singles main-draw entrants

Seeds

 1 Rankings are as of May 23 2022.

Other entrants
The following players received wildcards into the singles main draw:
  Brandon Holt
  Aleksandar Kovacevic
  Ben Shelton

The following players received entry into the singles main draw using protected rankings:
  Andrew Harris
  Wu Yibing

The following players received entry into the singles main draw as alternates:
  Malek Jaziri
  Roberto Quiroz
  Denis Yevseyev

The following players received entry from the qualifying draw:
  Adrian Andreev
  Martin Damm
  Gilbert Klier Júnior
  Matija Pecotić
  Michail Pervolarakis
  Keegan Smith

Champions

Singles

  Wu Yibing def.  Jason Kubler 6–7(5–7), 6–4, 3–1 ret.

Doubles

  Chung Yun-seong /  Michail Pervolarakis def.  Malek Jaziri /  Kaichi Uchida 6–7(5–7), 7–6(7–3), [16–14].

References

2022 ATP Challenger Tour
2022 in American tennis
June 2022 sports events in the United States
2022 in sports in Florida